The 29th Billboard Latin Music Awards ceremony, presented by Billboard to honor the most popular albums, songs and performers in Latin music, took place on September 29, 2022, at the Watsco Center in Coral Gables, Florida. The ceremony was broadcast by Telemundo.

The nominations were announced on August 18, 2022. Puerto Rican singer Chayanne received the Icon Award at the ceremony. Christina Aguilera was honored with the Spirit of Hope award, and also performed.

Performers
The performers for the ceremony were announced on August 25, 2022.

Winners and nominees
The nominations were announced on August 18, 2022, with Puerto Rican singer Bad Bunny leading with 23, followed by Karol G with 15, Farruko, with 11, Rauw Alejandro with 10, Aventura with 7 and Eslabon Armado with 6. With 23 nominations, Bad Bunny became one of the two artist to receive that amount of nominations in one ceremony, the other being Ozuna at the 2019 Billboard Latin Music Awards.

Winners appear first and highlighted in bold.

Special Merit Awards
Icon Award: Chayanne
Lifetime Achievement Award: Raphael
Spirit of Hope: Christina Aguilera
Legend Award: José Feliciano

References

Billboard Latin Music Awards
2022 in Latin music
2022 music awards
2022 in Florida